The Charlottenborg Spring Exhibition (Charlottenborg Forårsudstilling) is an annual art exhibition in Copenhagen, Denmark. 

The event is held at the Charlottenborg Exhibition Building (Kunsthal Charlottenborg). 
Kunsthal Charlottenborg  was erected in the former site of the Botanical Garden on a tract of land behind Charlottenborg Palace. The exhibition building was designed by architects Albert Jensen (1847–1913) and Ferdinand Meldahl  (1827–1908) and inaugurated in 1883.

Charlottenborg Spring Exhibition has been held annually since 1857 and  originated as an exhibition showing new works by Danish artists.
Today the event includes participants from many countries and is one of the most important open submission exhibitions in northern Europe.
It is organised by the Charlottenborg Foundation (Charlottenborg Fonden).

In 2007 the 150th anniversary of the exhibition was celebrated between 17 March and 9 April, and a book was published about the exhibition as an institution in Danish artistic culture.

References

External links 
 Kunsthal Charlottenborg Official Website
 The Spring Exhibition  Charlottenborg Fonden

Culture in Copenhagen
Organizations based in Copenhagen
Tourist attractions in Copenhagen
Royal Danish Academy of Fine Arts
1857 establishments in Denmark
Art exhibitions in Denmark